Banksia foliosissima is a species of erect shrub that is endemic to Western Australia. It has densely crowded, pinnatifid leaves, golden yellow flowers in heads of up to one hundred, and egg-shaped follicles. It is only known from two small areas in the south-west of the state.

Description
Banksia foliosissima is a shrub that typically grows to a height of  but does not form a lignotuber. The flowers are borne on a head containing between ninety and one hundred flowers in each head.

Taxonomy and naming
This species was first formally described in 1964 by Charles Austin Gardner who gave it the name Dryandra foliosissima and published the description in the Journal of the Royal Society of Western Australia from specimens he collected near Ravensthorpe.

In 2007, Austin Mast and Kevin Thiele transferred all the dryandras to the genus Banksia and this species became Banksia foliosissima. The specific epithet (foliosissima) is a Latin word meaning "leafy".

Distribution and habitat
Banksia foliosissima is only known from two disjunct areas, one near Tarin Rock and the other near Ravensthorpe, where it grows in dense kwongan.

Conservation status
This banksia is classified as "Priority Four" by the Government of Western Australia Department of Parks and Wildlife, meaning that is rare or near threatened.

References

foliosissima
Endemic flora of Western Australia
Plants described in 1964
Taxa named by Kevin Thiele